Jake Turner is the name of:

Jake Turner (footballer), English footballer
Jake Turner (musician), American musician